The wrentit (Chamaea fasciata) is a small bird that lives in chaparral, oak woodlands, and bushland on the western coast of North America. It is the only species in the genus Chamaea.

Its systematics have been the subject of much debate, the wrentit having been placed in many different families by different authors for as long as it has been known to science. Its common name reflects the uncertainty, and its external resemblance to both tits and wrens. It is not related to either, however. More recent and comprehensive phylogenetic studies support it belonging to the parrotbills.

Description

The wrentit is a small,  bird with uniform dull olive, brown, or grayish plumage. It has short wings and a long tail often held high (hence the comparison to wrens). It has a short bill and a pale iris. Given its retiring nature and loud voice, the wrentit is more likely to be detected by its call than by sight. The distinct sound that it makes is similar to the sound of a ping-pong ball falling on the table.

Systematics
The wrentit has been variously placed in its own family, the Chamaeidae, or with the long-tailed tits (Aegithalidae), the true tits and chickadees (Paridae), the "Old World warblers" (Sylviidae), and with the "Old World babblers" (Timaliidae). The American Ornithologists' Union places the wrentit in the latter family, giving it the distinction of being the only babbler known from the New World. This is based on DNA–DNA hybridization studies, which are phenetic, however, and therefore not considered methodologically adequate today.

Through DNA sequence analysis, it was subsequently discovered that the wrentit was more closely allied to Sylvia warblers and some aberrant "babblers". These consequently must be placed in the family Sylviidae together with the wrentit and the parrotbills which also turned out to be close relatives. Thus, the wrentit is the only American species of the "true" or sylviid warblers. Peculiarly, the Dartford warbler and close relatives like Marmora's warbler bear an uncanny resemblance to the wrentit; their ecology is quite similar indeed, as all are birds of Mediterranean scrub. However, biogeography and the molecular data build a strong case for this similarity being a case of convergent evolution between birds that are close relatives but by far not as close as their appearance would suggest.

Alice Cibois suggested that as some babblers are closer to typical warblers than these are to marsh-warblers for example, the Sylviidae should be merged into the Timaliidae. As such an abolishing of the senior synonym would require a formal International Commission on Zoological Nomenclature ruling and the typical warblers and relatives are still a monophyletic group at present, this proposal is not advanced by most researchers until the remaining Sylviidae and Timaliidae genera are studied as regards their relationships.

In 2019, a major taxonomic revision of species formerly classified as "babblers" recovered Chamaea as being most closely allied with the parrotbills and fulvettas, which are otherwise an exclusively Asian group. Due to their phylogenetic and morphological distinctiveness, the family Paradoxornithidae was revived for this group, including the wrentit.

Distribution

The wrentit is a sedentary (non-migratory) resident of a narrow strip of coastal habitat along the western coast of North America, being found from Oregon south through California, to Baja California, the northern state of the Baja California peninsula.

It is usually restricted to certain chaparral and woodland habitats. Logging and other changes in habitat have led to this species expanding its range recently, particularly northwards.

Ecology
Wrentits mate for life, forming pair bonds only a few months after hatching. Both sexes sing; the faster rhythm of the male's song is one of the few ways to differentiate the sexes. Both sexes also defend their territory year-round and participate in building the nest, a four-stage process that takes about two weeks. The three or four eggs are incubated for 14 days, again by both sexes. The chicks fledge after 15 days (at which stage they are unable to fly) and are fed by their parents for another 40 days.

The wrentit feeds by skulking through dense scrub gleaning exposed insects found by sight. It feeds primarily on beetles, caterpillars, bugs, and ants, but also takes small berries and seeds.

References

Further reading

External links

 
 
 

Paradoxornithidae
Birds of the United States
Birds of Mexico
Fauna of the California chaparral and woodlands
Birds described in 1845
Taxa named by William Gambel